The Dempsey Wood House is a historic home located near Kinston, North Carolina, United States.  Built in the mid-19th century, the house exemplifies the transition from Greek Revival to Victorian architecture.  Interesting architectural details of the home include the two-story porch and eight fireplaces.  The Dempsey Wood House was added to the National Register of Historic Places (NRHP) in 1971.

History
James Wood received a plantation from his father in 1836.  Records show Wood has begun building a home on the property by 1850, presently located at 3066 Kennedy Home Road (State Route 1324), near the intersection of Louie Pollock Road.  Construction wasn't completed until the Civil War, although the Wood family apparently lived in the house prior to that.  Wood's sons, Dempsey and James, lived in the house until 1892 when the property was divided and sold to N. J. Rouse.  The home was owned by a succession of people before being purchased in 1945 by W. C. Emerson.  The Emersons owned the home until at least 1971 when it was the subject of a historical survey.  The Dempsey Wood House was added to the NRHP on August 26, 1971.

Architecture
According to the historical survey of the Dempsey Wood House, it is "an important example of the transition from the pure Greek Revival to the more elaborate Victorian eclecticism which was becoming popular just before the Civil War."  The home is a two-story wooden frame house on brick piers.  The facade is three bays wide and includes a two-tiered porch supported by two square pillars and two paneled pilasters.  The second level of the porch features a rounded balustrade.  Two pairs of paneled pilasters support a thin entablature above the entrance.  Multi-paned sidelights  and a narrow transom are on either side of the front door.  The east and west sides of the home are four bays wide and feature two pairs of large common bond chimneys.  The chimneys are similar in design to ones found in the 17th century and believed to be the only ones of its type in the state.  Multi-paned sidelights and a pair of pilasters flank the double door rear entrance.  The windows on the front and rear sides of the house, most of which are original, are six-over-six sash while the narrow windows on the east and west sides are four-over-four sash.  Molded architraves and triangular pediments are above each window of the house.  The interior features a central hall layout plan.  The staircase with octagonal handrail is located on the right side of the hallway and is supported by a large newel.  The walls are covered with plastering and a vertical wainscot.  Architrave and paneled corner blocks frame the interior side of all of the home's doors and windows.

See also
 National Register of Historic Places listings in Lenoir County, North Carolina

References

Greek Revival houses in North Carolina
Houses on the National Register of Historic Places in North Carolina
National Register of Historic Places in Lenoir County, North Carolina
Victorian architecture in North Carolina
Houses in Lenoir County, North Carolina